Athena Technologies was a developer and manufacturer of control and navigation solutions for unmanned aerial vehicles (UAVs) and unmanned ground vehicles (UGVs). In April 2008, Athena was purchased by Rockwell Collins, Inc. for US$107 million.

Athena Technologies was founded in 1998. It was headquartered in Warrenton, Virginia. The company was created to develop and commercialize flight control technologies. Athena founder Dr. David Vos studied control theory at the Massachusetts Institute of Technology (MIT) where he proved the control technology by developing the first autonomous unicycle. In August 2014, Dr. Vos became the head of Google's Project Wing.

Athena's GuideStar product line provides INS/GPS solutions that integrate IMU, GPS, magnetometer and air data signals for dynamic maneuvering. Athena's products have been deployed on a variety of unmanned systems.

References

External links
 Archive of the official website
 Athena Technologies Selected to Provide Guidance and Navigation to EMT’S LUNA Unmanned Aerial Vehicle, Business Wire
 EMT selects Athena's GuideStar for Luna UAV conducting surveillance in Kosovo, Afghanistan, Pakistan
 NPR story: Technology for Unmanned Planes Shown in Paris
 Manned/Unmanned communities edge closer
 SEC filing

Manufacturing companies based in Virginia
Navigation system companies
Companies based in Virginia
Fauquier County, Virginia
Science and technology in Virginia